Dihydropyrimidinase-related protein 2 is an enzyme that in humans is encoded by the DPYSL2 gene.

Interactions
DPYSL2 has been shown to interact with CRMP1, Adaptor-related protein complex 2, alpha 1 and NUMB.

References

Further reading